Bibbona is a comune (municipality) in the Province of Livorno in the Italian region Tuscany, located about  southwest of Florence and about  southeast of Livorno in the Val di Cecina.

History
The town's hilly location allowed for natural defenses, and strong fortifications are known to have existed by the early middle ages. The area is known to have been settled earlier during the Etruscan period based on tombs and archeological finds, and settlement continued into the Roman period.

In the early middle ages, the town and fortifications were in the possession of the Gherardesca family, and their holdings were confirmed by Pope Innocent III in the 12th century. Thereafter, ownership transferred to the free towns of Volterra, Pisa, and eventually Florence.

In Bibbona the sculptor (Riccardo) Richard Aurili born in 1864.

Main sights
Romanesque Pieve di Sant'Ilario (founded in the 11th century).
Palazzo del Comune Vecchio, also medieval.
Fort of Bibbone, built by the Grand Dukes of Tuscany in the 18th century.

References

External links
 Official website

Cities and towns in Tuscany